Garriston is a hamlet and civil parish north-east of Leyburn in the Richmondshire district of North Yorkshire, England. In 2015, North Yorkshire County Council estimated the population at 20. At the 2011 census the population remained less than 100. Details are included in the parish of West Hauxwell.

References

External links

Hamlets in North Yorkshire
Civil parishes in North Yorkshire